Antimerina elegans is a species of beetle in the family Carabidae, the only species in the genus Antimerina.

References

Lebiinae